Christ Church in Clevedon, within the English county of Somerset was built between 1838 and 1839 by Richard Charles Hussey and Thomas Rickman and revised by George Phillips Manners and John Elkington Gill in the 1850s. It is a Grade II* listed building.

History

The construction of the church, to designs by Richard Charles Hussey and Thomas Rickman, was paid for by public subscription when the town of Clevedon was expanding rapidly. George Weare Braikenridge donated £1800 and a Flemish 14th century stained glass east window of the Tree of Jesse from his collection.

The parish is part of the benefice which includes St Andrew's and St Peter's within the Diocese of Bath and Wells.

Architecture

The limestone church has a six-bay nave, chancel and buttressed tower in the south west. The tower is topped by an embattled parapet and embellished crocketed pinnacles which were added as part of the 1850s revision by George Phillips Manners and John Elkington Gill.

See also
 List of ecclesiastical parishes in the Diocese of Bath and Wells

References

External links
 Church web site

Grade II* listed buildings in North Somerset
Grade II* listed churches in Somerset
19th-century Church of England church buildings